This list contains species first discovered in Hong Kong, with the endemic species asterisked.

Plants
Bauhinia (Bauhinia blakeana)
Crapnell's camellia (Camellia crapnelliana)
Grantham's camellia (Camellia granthamiana)
Hong Kong camellia (Camellia hongkongensis)
Hong Kong dogwood (Dendrobenthamia hongkongensis)
Hong Kong iris (Iris speculatrix)
Hong Kong balsam (Impatiens hongkongensis)
Pavetta (Pavetta hongkongensis)
Hong Kong croton (Croton hancei)*
Hong Kong wild kumquat (Fortunella hindsii), see Kumquat
Hong Kong bamboo (Arundinaria shiuyingiana)*
Lantau star-anise (Illicium angustisepalum)*
Hong Kong asarum (Asarum hongkongense)*
Shiuying bamboo (Arundinaria shiuyingiana)*
Subglabrous cane (Sasa subglabra)*
Two-coloured bulbophyllum (Bulbophyllum bicolor)*
Monteiro's caterpillar orchid (Cheirostylis monteiroi)*
Entire lip ginger (Zingiber integrilabrum)* (probably extinct)

Animals

Mammals
Chinese white dolphin (Sousa chinensis chinensis)

Amphibians
Romer's tree frog (Philautus romeri)*
Hong Kong newt (Paramesotriton hongkongensis)
Hong Kong cascade frog (Amolops hongkongensis)
Short-legged horned toad (Xenophrys brachykolos )*
Polypedates megacephalus
Fejervarya multistriata
Rana macrodactyla
Microhyla pulchra (Hallowell), 1861

Reptile
Hongkong blind skink (Dibamus bogadeki)*
Lazell's blind snake (Typhlops lazelli)*
Anderson's stream snake (Ophisthotropis andersonii)
Eumeces quadrilineatus (Blyth), 1853
Achalinus rufescens Boulenger, 1888
Calamaria septentrionalis Boulenger, 1890
Dendrelaphis hollonrakei Lazell, 2002
Ahaetulla prasina medioxima (Lazzell, 2002)

Fish
Aphyocpris lini
Hong Kong paradisefish (Macropodus hongkongensis)
Pseudogastromyzon myersi
Parazacco spilurus (Gunther), 1868
Pseudohemiculter dispar (Peters), 1880
Oreonectes platycephalus Gunther, 1868
Rhinogobius duospilus (Herre, 1935)
Bathyphylax bombifrons Myers, 1934
Figaro melanobranchus (Chan), 1965
Sphyraena putnamiae Jordan & Schlegel, 1905
Osteomugil strongylocephalus (Richardson), 1846
Argyrosomus pawak Lin, 1940
Nibea chui Trewavas, 1971
Callionymus altipinnis Fricke, 1981
Arnoglossus tenuis Gunther, 1880
Plagiopsetta fasciatus (Fowler), 1933
Brachirus swinhonis (Steindachner), 1867
Cynoglossus lineolatus Steindachner, 1867
Opistognathus hongkongiensis Chan, 1968
Bathygobius hongkongensis Lam, 1986
Paraploactis hongkongiensis (Chan, 1966)*
Xyrichtys trivittatus Randall & Cornish, 2000
Neopomacentrus bankieri (Richardson, 1846)

Mollusca
Phyllodesmium opalescene
Chloritis hungerfordiana rufopila
Cryptosoma imperator
Kaliella hongkongensis
Macrochlamys discus
Macrochlamys nitidissma
Marcrocycloides crenulate
Microcystina schmackerina
Microcystina stenomphala
Sinoenna splendens hongkongensis
Tornatellira boeningi

Annelida
Aglaophamus toloensis Ohwada, 1992

Malacostraca

Decapoda 

Haberma tingkok Cannicci & Ng, 2017
Perisesarma maipoensis (Soh, 1978)*
Parasesarma maipoensis
Nanhaipotamon hongkongense (Shen, 1940)*
Chiromanthes sereni (Soh, 1978)*
Pseudopythina patshuni (Soh, 1978)*
Charybdis hongkongensis Shen, 1934
Crypotopotamon anacoluthon (Kemp, 1918)*
Somanniathelphusa zanklon Ng & Dudgeon, 1992*
Caridina trifasciata (Yam & Cai, 2003)*
Caridina serrata (Stimpson, 1860)
Caridina apodosis Cai & Ng, 1999*
Neocaridina serrata*
Metapenaeopsis toloensis Hall, 1962
Periclimenes toloensis Bruce, 1969
Panulirus stimpsoni Holthuis, 1963
Periclimenes hongkongensis Bruce, 1969

Tanaids
Pakistanapseudes toloensis (Bamber, 1997)

Isopoda
Allokepon sinensis (Danforth, 1972)
Anchiarthrus derelictus Markham, 1992
Apophrixus constrictus Markham, 1980B
Aporobopyrus enosteoidis (Markham, 1982)
Bopyrione longicapitata Markham, 1980
Bopyrione toloensis Markham, 1980
Dicropleon morator Markham, 1980
Hypocepon globosus Markham, 1992
Litobopyrus longicaudatus Markham, 1980B
Orbione penei Bonnier, 1900
Parabopyrella perplexa Markham, 1990B
Probopyria elliptica Markham, 1992
Probopyrus novempalensis Markham, 1980B
Progebiophilus sinicus Markham, 1980B
Pseudostegias dulcilacuum Markham, 1980B
Rhopalione sinensis Markham, 1990B
Stegophryxus minutus Markham, 1992
Tylokepon naxiae (Bonnier, 1900)
Colanthura daguilarensis Bamber, 2000
Dryadillo maculatus (Arcangeli, 1952B)
Exalloniscus rotundatus Taiti & Ferrara, 1986A
Burmoniscus ocellatus (Verhoeff, 1928D)
Dynoides daguilarensis Li 2000

Arachnida

Araneae

Gnaphosidae
Hongkongia wuae
Philodromidae
Thanatus hongkong Song, Zhu & Wu, 1997
Lycosidae
Pardosa pacata Fox, 1937
Hahniidae
Hahnia thortoni Brignoli, 1982*
Amaurobiidae
Bifidocoelotes primus (Fox, 1937)*
Oxyopidae
Oxyopes daksina Sherriffs, 1955
Salticidae
Pseudamycus bicoronatus Simon, 1901*
Pseudamycus relucens Simon, 1901*
Pancorius hongkong Song & al., 1997*
Bianor hongkong Song, Xie, Zhu, Wu, 1997*
Langona hongkong Song, Xie, Zhu, Wu, 1997*
Habrocestum hongkongiensis Proszynski, 1992*
Icius hongkong  Song, Xie, Zhu, Wu, 1997*
Nanthela hongkong (Song & Wu, 1997)
Portia orientalis Murphy & Murphy, 1983
Thiania inermis (Karsch, 1897)

Corinnidae
Castianeira hongkong Song, Zhu & Wu, 1997
Liphistiidae
Nanthela hongkong (Song and Wu, 1997)
Thomisidae
Mastira tegularis Xu, Han & Li, 2008*
Massuria bellula Xu, Han & Li, 2008*
Diaea simplex Xu, Han & Li, 2008*
Lysiteles hongkong Song, Zhu & Wu, 1997
Ebrechtella hongkong (Song, Zhu & Wu, 1997)

Acari

Copidognathus daguilarensis Bartsch, 1997
Copidognathus gracilunguis Bartsch, 1992
Copidognathus inconspicuus Bartsch, 1991
Copidognathus longiunguis Bartsch, 1990
Copidognathus monacanthus Bartsch, 1992
Copidognathus neptuneus Bartsch, 1992
Copidognathus occultans Bartsch, 1991
Copidognathus paluster Bartsch, 1991
Copidognathus polyporus Bartsch, 1991
Copidognathus strictulus Bartsch, 1997
Copidognathus umbonatus Bartsch, 1992
Copidognathus vicinus Bartsch, 1997
Rhombognathus arenarius Bartsch, 1992
Rhombognathus dictyotus Bartsch, 1992
Rhombognathus hirtellus Bartsch, 1992
Rhombognathus luxtoni (Bartsch, 1992)
Rhombognathus neptunellus Bartsch, 1992
Rhombognathus obesus (Bartsch, 1992)
Rhombognathus setellus Bartsch, 1992
Rhombognathus sinensis Bartsch, 1990
Rhombognathus sinensoideus Bartsch, 1992
Rhombognathus verrucosus Bartsch, 1992
Actacarus sinensis Bartsch, 1991
Copidognathus acanthoscelus Bartsch, 1992
Copidognathus cephalocanthus Bartsch, 1992
Copidognathus cerberoideus Bartsch, 1991
Copidognathus consobrinus Bartsch, 1991
Copidognathus gracilunguis Bartsch, 1992
Copidognathus daguilarensis Bartsch, 1997
Copidognathus inconspicuus Bartsch, 1991
Copidognathus longiunguis Bartsch, 1990
Copidognathus monacanthus Bartsch, 1992
Copidognathus neptuneus Bartsch, 1992
Copidognathus occultans Bartsch, 1991
Copidognathus paluster Bartsch, 1991
Copidognathus polyporus Bartsch, 1991
Copidognathus strictulus Bartsch, 1997
Copidognathus umbonatus Bartsch, 1992
Copidognathus vicinus Bartsch, 1997
Arhodeoporus minusculus Bartsch, 1991
Agauopsis ammodytes Bartsch, 1992
Agauopsis arenaria Bartsch, 1992
Agauopsis humilis Bartsch, 1992
Agauopsis sordida Bartsch, 1992
Scaptognathus triunguis Bartsch, 1991
Simognathus foveolatus Bartsch, 1991
Acarochelopodia lapidaria Bartsch, 1991
Litarachna hongkongensis Smit, 2002

Insects

Lepidoptera

Tineoidea
Tineidae
Myrmecozelinae
Thisizima fasciaria Yang, Li & Kendrick, 2012
Thisizima subceratella Yang, Li & Kendrick, 2012
Gracillarioidea
Gracillariidae
Gracillariinae
Gibbovalva singularis Bai & Li, 2008
Gelechioidea
Oecophoridae
Oecophorinae
Promalactis quinilineata Wang, Kendrick & Sterling, 2009*
Promalactis similinfulata Wang, Kendrick & Sterling, 2009*
Promalactis noviloba Wang, Kendrick & Sterling, 2009*
Promalactis longiuncata Wang, Kendrick & Sterling, 2009*
Promalactis biovata Wang, Kendrick & Sterling, 2009*
Promalactis lobatifera Wang, Kendrick & Sterling, 2009*
Promalactis apicispinifera Wang, Kendrick & Sterling, 2009*
Stereodytis acutidens Wang & Kendrick, 2009*
Stereodytis brevignatha Wang & Kendrick, 2009*
Stathmopodidae
Hieromantis arcuata Guan & Li, 2015
Stathmopoda tetracantha Wang, Wang & Guan, 2021*
Xyloryctidae
Xyloryctinae
Neospastis sinensis Bradley, 1967*
Cosmopterigidae
Scaeosophinae
Scaeosopha hongkongensis Li & Zhang, 2012*
Gelechiidae
Dichomeridinae
Dichomeris argentenigera Li, Zhen & Kendrick, 2010
Dichomeris hamulifera Li, Zhen & Kendrick, 2010*
Dichomeris parvisexafurca Li, Zhen & Kendrick, 2010*
Sesioidea
Sesiidae
Sesiinae - Sesiini
Toleria sinensis (Walker, 1854)*
Sesiinae - Paranthrenini
Gaea variegata (Walker, 1854)*
Zygaenoidea
Epipyropidae
Fulgoraecia bowringii Newman, 1851
Tortricoidea
Tortricidae
Tortricinae - Cochylini
Gynnidomorpha pista (Diakonoff, 1984)*Original combination = Phalonidia pista Diakonoff, 1984
Chlidanotinae - Hilarographini
Hilarographa shehkonga Razowski, 2009*
Olethreutinae
Sorolopha archimedias (Meyrick, 1912)Original combination = Argyroploce archimedias Meyrick, 1912
Pyraloidea
Crambidae
Musotiminae
Siamusotima disrupta Solis, 2017*
Spilomelinae
Palpita minuscula Inoue, 1996*
Palpita parvifraterna Inoue, 1999*
Geometroidea
Geometridae
Ennominae
Microcalicha reelsi Sato & Galsworthy, 1998
Pseudothalera carolinae Galsworthy, 1997
Psilalcis galsworthyi Sato, 1996*

Larentiinae
Sauris purpurotincta Galsworthy, 1999
Sauris victoriae Galsworthy, 1999*
Axinoptera anticostalis Galsworthy, 1999
Eupithecia sekkongensis Galsworthy, 1999a junior synonym of E. mundiscripta (Warren, 1907)
Sigilliclystis kendricki Galsworthy, 1999*
Spiralisigna gloriae Galsworthy, 1999*
Geometrinae
Pingasa chloroides Galsworthy, 1997*
Maxates brevicaudata Galsworthy, 1997*
Thalassodes maipoensis Galsworthy, 1997*
Berta rugosivalva Galsworthy, 1997
Microloxia chlorissoides (Prout, 1912)
Papilionoidea
Hesperiidae
Hesperiinae
Halpe paupera walthewi Devyatkin, 2002*
Bombycoidea
Sphingidae
Macroglossinae - Macroglossini
Theretra suffusa (Walker, 1856)
Noctuoidea
Notodontidae
Notodontinae
Neodrymonia taipoensis Galsworthy, 1997
Erebidae
Arctiinae - Lithosiini
Cyana harterti (Elwes, 1890)
Lymantriinae - Orgyiini
Aroa ochripicta Moore, 1879a junior synonym of A. substrigosa (Walker, 1855)
Lymantriinae - Nygmiini
Euproctis seitzi Strand, 1910
Hypenodinae - Hypenodini
Luceria striata Galsworthy, 1997*
Schrankia bilineata Galsworthy, 1997*
Hypenodinae - Micronoctuini - Belluliina
Bellulia galsworthyi Fibiger, 2008*
Fustius sterlingi Fibiger, 2010*
Hypeninae
Lysimelia lucida Galsworthy, 1997*
Pangraptinae
Pangrapta bicornuta Galsworthy, 1997*
Pangrapta roseinotata Galsworthy, 1997*
Boletobiinae - Aventiini
Cerynea discontenta Galsworthy, 1998*
Hyposada kadooriensis Galsworthy, 1998*
Erebiinae
Oglasa stygiana Galsworthy, 1997
Ugia purpurea Galsworthy, 1997
Ugia insuspecta Galsworthy, 1997
Nolidae
Nolinae
Spininola kendricki László & Sterling, 2020*
Hampsonola ceciliae László & Sterling, 2020*
Eligminae
Baroa vatala Swinhoe, 1894
Noctuidae
Dyopsinae
Belciana scorpio Galsworthy, 1997*
Bagisarinae
Chasmina sinuata Galsworthy, 1997*
Noctuinae - Caradrinini - Athetiina
Athetis hongkongensis Galsworthy, 1997*
Athetis bispurca Galsworthy, 1997*
Noctuinae - Orthosiini
Egira ambigua Galsworthy, 1997*

Odonata

Cordullidae
Macromidia katae Wilson, 1993
Macromidia ellanae Wilson, 1996*
Gomphidae
Leptogomphus elegans hongkongensis Asahina, 1988*
Fukienogomphus choifongae Wilson & Tam, 2006*
Melligomphus molluami Wilson, 1995

Megapodagrionidae
Rhipidolestes janetae Wilson, 1977*
Platystictidae
Drepanosticta hongkongensis Wilson, 1977
Protosticta beaumonti Wilson, 1997
Protosticta taipokauensis Asahina & Dudgeon, 1987
Stylogomphus chunliuae Chao, 1954

Ephemeroptera

Baetidae
Alainites acutulus Tong & Dudgeon, 2000
Alainites lingulatus Tong & Dudgeon, 2000
Chorpralla fusina Tong & Dudgeon, 2000
Caenis bicornis Tong & Dudgeon, 2000
Caenis lubrica Tong & Dudgeon, 2000
Ephemerellidae
Serratella albostriata Tong & Dudgeon, 2000
Torleya arenosa Tong & Dudgeon, 2000

Heptageniidae
Compsoneuria taipokauensis Tong & Dudgeon, 2000
Epeorus sagittatus Tong & Dudgeon, 2000
Heptagenia ngi Hsu, 1936
Leptophlebiidae
Choroterpes petersi Tong & Dudgeon, 2000
Prosopistomatidae
Prosopistoma sinensis Tong & Dudgeon, 2000

Phasmatodea
Phasmatidae
Ramulus caii (Brock & Seow-Choen 2000)
Entoria victoria Brock & Seow-Choen, 2000*
Heteronemiidae
Phraortes stomphax (Westwood 1859)*
Sipyloidea shukayi Bi, Zhang & Lau, 2001*
Neohirasea hongkongensis Brock & Seow-Choen, 2000*
Macellina souchongia (Westwood, 1859)

Megaloptera
Corydalidae
Neochauliodes bowringi (McLachlan, 1867)

Coleoptera

Coccinellidae
Coccidulinae
Rodolia pumila Weise, 1892
Scymninae
Horniolus hisamatsui Miyatake, 1976*
Diomus lantauensis Yu & Lau, 2001*
Nephus eurypodus Yu & Lau, 2001
Scymnus alocasia Yu & Lau, 2001*
Coccinellinae
Lemnia circumusta (Mulsant, 1850)
Illeis confusa Timberlake, 1943
Eulichadidae
Eulichas dudgeoni Jach in Jach & Li, 1995
Scarabaeidae
Onthophagus convexicollis Boheman, 1858
Onthophagus proletarius Harold, 1875
Onthophagus luridipennis Boheman, 1858
Onthophagus taurinus White, 1844
Onthophagus lunatus Harold, 1868
Onthophagus orientalis Harold, 1868
Sisyphus bowringi White, 1841

Staphylinidae
Atheta hongongiphila
Atheta hoihaensis
Atheta samchunensis
Pedinopleurus hongkongicola
Zyras falsus Hlaváč, 2005*
Zyras lacunarumbeneolentium Pace, 1993*
Leiodidae
Agathidium xianggangense Angelini & Cooter, 1999*
Agathidium bowringi Angelini & Cooter, 1999*
Chrysomelidae
Downesia tarsata Baly, 1869
Dactylispa pungens (Boheman), 1859
Callispa bowringi Baly, 1858
Chiridopsis bowringii (Boheman, 1885)
Oides bowringii (Baly, 1863)
Cerambycidae
Pterolophia hongkongensis Gressitt, 1942
Sciades hongkongensis Breuning, 1968

Hymenoptera

Chalcidoidea
Aphelinidae
Aphelininae
Aphelinus hongkongensis Hayat, 1994
Encyrtidae
Encrytinae
Leurocerus hongkongensis Subba Rao, 1971
Ormyridae
Ormyrinae
Ormyrus hongkongensis Narendran, 1999
Chrysidoidea
Bethylidae
Mesitiinae
Metrionotus hongkongensis Moczar, 1974
Pristocerinae
Pseudisobrachium hongkongense Terayama, 1996
Dyrinidae
Dryininae
Dryinus bellicus Olmi, 1987
Gonatopodinae
Neodryinus dolosus Olmi, 1984*

Apoidea
Crabronidae
Larrinae
Trypoxylon takasago hongkongense Tsuneki, 1981
Vespoidea
Formicidae
Formicinae
Camponotus maculatus hongkongensissubspecies name not listed on Hymenoptera Name Server v1.5
Camponotus irritans hongkongensis Forel, 1912
Myrmicinae
Pheidole hongkongensis Wheeler, 1928
Vespidae
Polistinae
Ropalidia hongkongensis (Saussure, 1854)
Eumeninae
Parancistrocerus hongkongensis Gusenleitner, 2002

Isoptera
Rhinotermitidae
Coptotermes hongkongensis Oshima, 1914
Coptotermes melanoistriatus Lau & He, 1995
Termitidae
Ahmaditermes choui Ping & Tong, 1989
Macrotermes planicapitatus Gao & Lau, 1996
Nasutitermes choui Ping & Xu, 1989
Nasutitermes dudgeoni Gao & Lam, 1986

Psocoptera
Epipsocidae
Hinduipsocus hongkongensis Li & Mockford, 1997
Mesopsocidae
Mesopsocus hongkongensis Thornton, 1959
Peripsocidae
Peripsocus hongkongensis Thornton & Wong, 1968

Diptera

Ceratopogonidae
Forcipomyia nanshengwei
Forcipomyia yuani
Forcipomyia fengjiensis
Forcipomyiia claris
Bezzia datana
Bezzia lujingi
Leptoconops hongkongensis
Dasyhelea abronica

Culicidae
Uranotaenia jacksoni Edwards, 1935
Uranotaenia macfarlanei Edwards, 1914
Culex annulus Theobald, 1901
Culex infantulus Edwards, 1922
Culex jacksoni Edwards, 1934
Aedes macfarianei (Edwards), 1914
Ficalbia jacksoni Mattingly, 1949
Anopheles minimus Theobald, 1901
Anopheles maculatus Theobald, 1901
Tachinidae
Peribaea hongkongensis Tachi & Shima, 2002

Hemiptera
Aleyrodidae
Paraleyrodes pseudonaranjae Martin, 2001
Aphididae
Aulacophoroides millettiae Qiao, Jiang & Martin, 2006
Toxoptera victroiae Martin, 1991
Coccidae
Cribropulvinaria tailungensis Hodgson & Martin, 2001
Fistulococcus pokfulamensis Hodgson & Martin, 2005
Miridae
 Orientomiris sinicus (Walker), 1873

Trichoptera
Helicopsychidae
Helicopsyche agnetae Johanson & Oláh, 2008

See also

Environment of Hong Kong

References

For the plants:
Hu Qi-ming ed., 2003. Rare and Precious Plants of Hong Kong. Hong Kong: Agriculture, Fisheries and Conservation Department; Friends of the Country Parks; Cosmos Books. October 2003 revised edition. .

For the animals:
  & , 2008, A review of the genus Gibbovalva (Lepidoptera: Gracillariidae: Gracillariinae) from China. Oriental Insects 42: 317-326.
 , 2009. Microlepidoptera of Hong Kong: Checklist of Gracillariidae (Lepidoptera: Gracillarioidea). SHILAP Revista de Lepidopterología 37 (148): 495-509.
, 1984. Synopsis and descriptions of new species of the South Asiatic Cochylinae (Lepidoptera: Tortricidae), with an appendix. Zoologische Mededelingen, Leiden 58: 261-293. (including full text PDF)
  2008: Revision of the Micronoctuidae (Lepidoptera: Noctuoidea). Part 2, Taxonomy of the Belluliinae, Magninae and Parachrostiinae. Zootaxa, 1867: 1-136. Abstract & excerpt
  2010: Revision of the Micronoctuidae (Lepidoptera: Noctuoidea) Part 3, Taxonomy of the Tactusinae. Zootaxa, 2583: 1–119. Preview
, 1997. New and revised species of macrolepidoptera from Hong Kong. Memoirs of the Hong Kong Natural History Society. 21: 127-150, 25 figures, 1 plate.
, 1998a. Two new species of acontiines from Hong Kong (Lepidoptera, Noctuidae, Acontiinae). Transactions of the Lepidopterological Society of Japan 49: 30-32.
, 1998b. A new species of Pingasa (Lepidoptera, Geometridae, Geometrinae) from Hong Kong. Transactions of the Lepidopterological Society of Japan 49: 104-106.
, 1999a. Two new species of Sauris (Lepidoptera, Geometridae, Larentiinae) from Hong Kong. Transactions of the Lepidopterological Society of Japan 50: 35-37.
, 1999b. New and revised eupitheciine species (Geometridae, Larentiinae) from Hong Kong and South East Asia. Transactions of the Lepidopterological Society of Japan 50: 223-234
, 1996. Revision of the genus Palpita Hübner (Crambidae, Pyraustinae) from the Eastern Palaearctic, Oriental and Australian Regions. Part 1: Group A (annulifer Group). Tinea 15: 12-46.
, 1999. Revision of the genus Palpita Hübner (Crambidae, Pyraustinae) from the Eastern Palaearctic, Oriental and Australian Regions. Part 3: Additions and Corrections. Tinea 16: 52-60.
 &  2006: Revised higher classification of the Noctuoidea (Lepidoptera). Canadian Entomologist 138: 610-635. 
 &  2020: Illustrated checklist of Nolinae (Lepidoptera, Nolidae) of Hong Kong, China, with description of two new species. Ecologica Montenegrina 33: 33-58. 
,  & , 2012. Review of the genus Scaeosopha Meyrick, 1914 (Lepidoptera, Cosmopterigidae, Scaeosophinae) in the world, with descriptions of sixteen new species. Zootaxa 3322: 1-34. Preview
Microlepidoptera of Hong Kong: Taxonomic study on the genus Dichomeris Hübner, 1818, with descriptions of three new species (Lepidoptera: Gelechiidae). SHILAP Revista de lepidopterología 38 (149): 67-89.
, 1996. Six new species of the genus Psilalcis Warren (Geometridae, Ennominae) from Indo-Malayan region, with some taxonomic notes on the allied species. Tinea 15: 55-68.
 & , 1998. Description of a new species of the genus Microcalicha Sato (Geometridae) from Hong Kong. Tinea 15: 240-242.
; ; ;  & , 2017. Another new Lygodium-boring species of the musotimine genus Siamusotima (Lepidoptera: Crambidae) from China. Proceedings of the Entomological Society of Washington. 119 (3): 471–480. .
,  & , 2021. Genus Stathmopoda Herrich-Schäffer, 1853 (Lepidoptera: Stathmopodidae) from China: Descriptions of ten new species. Zootaxa 4908: 451–472. 
 & , 2009. Genus Stereodytis Meyrick (Lepidoptera: Oecophoridae) of China, with descriptions of two new species. Entomologica Fennica 20: 186–190. abstract
,  & , 2009. Microlepidoptera of Hong Kong: Oecophoridae I: the genus Promalactis Meyrick. Zootaxa 2239: 31–44.  (abstract)
,  & , 2012. Taxonomic study of the genus Thisizima Walker, 1864 in China, with descriptions of two new species (Lepidoptera, Tineidae). ZooKeys 254: 109–120. 
 & , 2001. A contribution to knowledge of the ladybirds of Hong Kong, with description of three new species (Coleoptera: Coccinellidae). Memoirs of the Hong Kong Natural History Society. 24: 147-179.

External links
Hong Kong Plant Database
Hong Kong Butterflies listing
Hong Kong Moths listing
The Global Lepidoptera Names Index

Environment of Hong Kong